Balys Gajauskas (24 February 1926 – 28 September 2017) was a Lithuanian politician.  In 1990 he was among those who signed the Act of the Re-Establishment of the State of Lithuania.  In 1978 he became a prisoner of conscience after being sentenced for "anti-Soviet agitation and propaganda" by the Supreme Court of the Lithuanian SSR. Before that he had served a 25-year sentence for having participated in the Lithuanian anti-Soviet resistance, being released in 1973.

References

1926 births
2017 deaths
Amnesty International prisoners of conscience held by the Soviet Union
Lithuanian politicians
Soviet dissidents
Lithuanian prisoners and detainees
Soviet prisoners and detainees
Signatories of the Act of the Re-Establishment of the State of Lithuania
People from Vilkaviškis